An itan to violi pouli ( - If violin was a willie), alternative title Kai aftos to violi tou ( - And yet he keeps going) is a 1984 Greek comedy film that was directed by Takis Vougiouklakis and produced by Lakis Mihalidis, starring Sotiris Moustakas.

Plot
Lefteris Paganinakis, a word play on Paganini, is thrown in jail after becoming involved in a brawl which was caused by two rival priests quarrelling over who gets to use Lefteris' orchestra as an attraction for churchgoers.  While in prison, he gets to relate his life's story to a fellow inmate.  It is revealed that Lefteris had three weddings which all ended up in divorce proceedings presided over by the same judge.  Other aspects of his adventures and tribulations are unfurled during this narration, along with certain aspects of prison life.  But two pleasant surprises await him.  One of the two priests visits him in jail and the clerical rivalry is rekindled.  Meanwhile, the judge has a way for Lefteris to circumvent the legal restrictions on matrimony.

Cast
Sotiris Moustakas .... Lefteris Paganinakis
Giannis Mihalopoulos .... Divorce Judge
Giannis Vogiatzis .... Inmate Vlassis Boukas
Thanos Papadopoulos .... Papa-Fotis (Priest #1)
Kostas Makedos .... Papa-Giorgis (Priest #2)
Kostas Palios .... Doctor Thanos Tsoukantas
Vina Askini .... Anna Tsourapidi - Paganinaki
Athina Mavrommati .... Maria Paganinaki
Stella Konstantinou .... Evgenia Paganinaki

External links

1984 films
1980s Greek-language films
1984 comedy films
Greek comedy films